Natividad, officially the Municipality of Natividad, is a 4th class municipality in the province of Pangasinan, Philippines. According to the 2020 census, it has a population of 25,771 people.

History
ETYMOLOGY
There was no strong historical account as to how the town of Natividad got its name.  It is believed however, that the name Natividad arose from the literal meaning of the birth or nativity of the town. The town of Natividad was born after the conversion of the community of people from the different parts of the Province of Pangasinan and neighboring provinces, into a Municipality that they came up with a name Natividad.

CREATION OF THE TOWN
The town of Natividad was once a conglomeration of barrios and sitios bounded by the Municipality of San Quintin on the south, San Nicolas on the north, and Tayug on the west.

Dating back on December 12, 1901, this humble place was visited by a number of enterprising men who came from neighboring towns of Pangasinan and Ilocos Provinces.  These people were looking for a location that could be a good place for settlements.  On January 2 of the following year, these people finally settled in this place with their families.  They added to the several groups of people living in the territory prior to their arrival.

Because of increased number in people and area ran by a single leader whom they appointed, plans were drawn for the organization of a municipality.  Organizational meetings and activities were undertaken to pursue this noble endeavor.  The enactment of Act 371 of the Philippine Commission on March 7, 1902 that converted the community into a municipality awarded these people for their efforts and hard work.

There were 11 barangays that emerged first and these are now the barangays of San Eugenio, Licud, Recodo, Barangobong, Amanit and San Modesto, from the Municipality of San Nicolas;  San Narciso, Canarem and Cabuaan, from the Municipality of Tayug;  and Tolin and Bucno from the Municipality of San Quintin.

PAST AND PRESENT MUNICIPAL MAYORS
Natividad’s history takes a common story of new migrants from different places with the objectives to seek for new frontiers to conquer and new place to tame for settlements.  People from the various quarters of Pangasinan, La Union, Ilocos Sur and Abra constituted to be the first inhabitants of the town.

With the natural resources that the forest served, the people used these to cultivate the area and prepare the land for the production of their food supply and other needs.  The present central and eastern sections of the municipality were then a dense forest wherein the people got most of their food supplies and farming materials.

Values of industry, peacefulness, kindness and religiousness guided these first settlers, despite the difficulty of communication and transportation services, which was made even worse because they lived in very distant places, they remained close and intact.  Their leaders showed good and exemplary behaviors and gave their best to improve the social life of the people.

During the early part of the American sovereignty in the Philippines, an American with the name of Captain Joseph B. Batchelor of the American Army consequently made possible the foundation of a stronger and unified municipality.  Captain Batchelor possessed the bearing and culture that spoke loudly on American and Anglo-Saxon traditions and ideals, thus, the inhabitants had their new and unique experiences during these times.

Captain Batchelor became a big contributor in the development of the town for his dissemination and dedication to guide and help the people.  He guided them with all integrity and educated them with noble examples of life, incorporating with them the American values of love of freedom and self-dissemination.  These values later on were inculcated in the hearts and minds of the people and became their guides in their journey to life.  In memory of this noble man and as a sign of gratitude, two barangays – Batchelor East and Batchelor West-of the town were named after him.

Geography

Barangays
Natividad is politically subdivided into 18 barangays. These barangays are headed by elected officials: Barangay Captain, Barangay Council, whose members are called Barangay Councilors. All are elected every three years.

Elected Municipal Officials (2022-2025)

Gallery

References

External links

 Natividad Profile at PhilAtlas.com
 Municipal Profile at the National Competitiveness Council of the Philippines
 Natividad at the Pangasinan Government Website
 Local Governance Performance Management System
 [ Philippine Standard Geographic Code]
 Philippine Census Information

Municipalities of Pangasinan